Luca Kozák (born 1 June 1996) is a Hungarian athlete specialising in the sprint hurdles. She represented her country at the 2016 World Indoor Championships without qualifying for the final. In addition she won the silver medal at the 2015 European Junior Championships.

Her personal bests are 12.71  seconds in the 100 metres hurdles (-0.2 m/s, Székesfehérvár) and 7.97 seconds in the 60 metres hurdles (Glasgow 2019, Torun and Budapest 2020). Both times are Hungarian Records.

Competition record

1Did not start in the final
2Did not finish in the semifinal

References

1996 births
Living people
Hungarian female hurdlers
Place of birth missing (living people)
Universiade medalists in athletics (track and field)
Universiade bronze medalists for Hungary
Hungarian Athletics Championships winners
World Athletics Championships athletes for Hungary
Medalists at the 2017 Summer Universiade
Athletes (track and field) at the 2020 Summer Olympics
Olympic athletes of Hungary
European Athletics Championships medalists